The siege of Trichinopoly took place in early 1741 during an extended series of conflicts between the Nawab of Arcot and the Maratha Empire for control over parts of what is now southern India.  Raghuji Bhonsle's Maratha army successfully starved out the town, compelling the surrender of Chanda Sahib on 26 March 1741.

References

Mehta, J. L. Advanced study in the history of modern India 1707-1813
Mackenna, P. J. et al. Ancient and modern India

Sieges involving the Maratha Empire
Sieges involving the Indian kingdoms
Siege of Trichinopoly (1741)
Siege of Trichinopoly (1741)
History of Tiruchirappalli

Invasions by India